Washbrook is a locational surname of British origin, named after villages such as Washbrook in Suffolk. The name may refer to:

Cyril Washbrook (1914–1999), British cricket player
Danny Washbrook (born 1985), British rugby league player

References

English toponymic surnames